Richard Óg Burke, 2nd Clanricarde or Mac William Uachtar (died 1387) was an Irish chieftain and nobleman who was the son of Sir Ulick Burke or Uilleag de Burgh, 1st Clanricarde (d.1343/1353).

Richard died in 1387, and was succeeded by his son, Ulick an Fhiona Burke, 3rd Clanricarde (d.1424).

Annalistic references

 M1366.10. A great war broke out between the English of Connaught. Mac Maurice was banished from his territory by Mac William; and Mac Maurice fled for protection to the Clann-Rickard. Mac William, Hugh O'Conor, King of Connaught, and William O'Kelly, Lord of Hy-Many, marched with an army to Upper Connaught against the Clann-Rickard, and remained there nearly three months engaged in mutual hostilities, until at last Mac William subdued the Clann-Rickard; whereupon the hostages of these latter were delivered up to him, and he returned to his country in triumph.

Genealogy

 Richard an Fhorbhair de Burgh (d.1343)
 Sir William (Ulick) de Burgh (d. 1343/53), 1st Mac William Uachtar (Upper Mac William) or Clanricarde (Galway)
 Richard Óg Burke (d. 1387), 2nd Clanricarde
 Ulick an Fhiona Burke (d. 1424), 3rd Clanricarde
 Ulick Ruadh Burke (d. 1485), 5th Clanricarde
 Edmund Burke (d. 1466)
 Ricard of Roscam (d. 1517)
 John mac Richard Mór Burke (d. 1536), 10th Clanricarde
 Ulick Fionn Burke (d.1509), 6th Clanricarde
 Ulick Óge Burke (d. 1520), 8th Clanricarde
 Richard Mór Burke (d. 1530), 9th Clanricarde
 Ulick na gCeann Burke (d. 1544), 12th Clanricarde, 1st Earl of Clanricarde (1543)
 Richard Bacach Burke (d. 1538), 11th Clanricarde
 Richard Óge Burke (d. 1519), 7th Clanricarde
 Sir Uilleag Burke (d. 1551), 13th Clanricarde
 William mac Ulick Burke (d. 1430), 4th Clanricarde
 Edmund de Burgh (d. 1410)

Family 
Richard married a daughter of O'Madden of Síol Anmchadha. They had two children:

 Ulick an Fhiona Burke, 3rd Clanricarde (d.1424)
 William mac Ulick Burke, 4th Clanricarde (d.1430)

References

1387 deaths
Irish lords
People from County Galway
14th-century Irish people
Richard Og
Year of birth unknown